Applied Data Research (ADR) was a large software vendor from the 1960s until the mid-1980s.  ADR is often described as "the first independent software vendor".

Founded in 1959, ADR was originally a contract development company. ADR eventually built a series of its own products.  ADR's widely used major packages included: Autoflow for automatic flowcharting, Roscoe, MetaCOBOL, an extensible macro processor for the COBOL language, and Librarian for source-code management. ADR later purchased the Datacom/DB database management system from Insyte Datacom and developed the companion product, IDEAL (Interactive Development Environment for an Application’s Life), a fourth-generation programming language.

Another popular ADR product was The Librarian, a version control system for IBM mainframe operating systems, now known as CA Librarian. In 1978, it was reported that The Librarian was in use at over 3,000 sites; by a decade later that number had doubled.

First software patent
ADR received the first patent issued for a computer program, a sorting system, on April 23, 1968.  The program was developed by Martin A. Goetz.

ADR IBM lawsuit
ADR instigated litigation in Federal Court against IBM with accusations that IBM was "retarding the growth of the independent software industry"  and "monopolizing the software industry", leading to IBM's famous unbundling of software and services in 1969. In 1970, ADR  and Programmatics, a wholly owned subsidiary of ADR,  received an out-of-court settlement of $1.4 million from IBM.  IBM also agreed to serve as a supplier of Autoflow, which meant another potential $600,000 in revenues for ADR.

Dispute with Nixdorf
ADR licensed DATACOM/DB to TCSC, a firm which sold modified versions of IBM's DOS/360 and DOS/VS operating systems, known as Edos. When, in 1980, Nixdorf Computer bought TCSC, Nixdorf sought to continue the licensing arrangement; ADR and NCSC went to court in a dispute over whether the licensing arrangement was terminated by the acquisition. ADR and Nixdorf settled out of court in 1981, with an agreement that Nixdorf could continue to resell ADR's products.

Corporate history
ADR bought Massachusetts Computer Associates, also known as Compass, in the late 1960s. ADR was sold to Ameritech in 1986 and was kept intact as a subsidiary.  In 1988 Ameritech sold ADR to Computer Associates (unrelated to Massachusetts Computer Associates; subsequently rename CA Technologies ). Computer Associates integrated the company into its Systems Products Division and new Information Products Division.

Roscoe
Roscoe (Remote OS Conversational Operating Environment, originally marketed as ROSCOE, last marketed as CA-Roscoe) was a software product for IBM Mainframes. It is a text editor and also provides some operating system functionality such as the ability to submit batch jobs similar to ISPF or XEDIT.

Overview
The ability to support 200+ concurrent active users and still have low overhead is based on a Single address space architecture.

RPF
The RPF (Roscoe Programming Facility) is a scripting language with string processing capability.

References

External links
 www.softwarehistory.org – Martin A. Goetz, "How ADR Got Into the Software Products Business and Found Itself Competing Against IBM" (1998)
 Oral history interview with Martin Goetz, Charles Babbage Institute, University of Minnesota.
 Software Memories – Some basic facts about ADR
 In new case, Supreme Court revisits the question of software patents (ADR held the first USA software patent)

Defunct software companies of the United States
Software companies established in 1959
Electronics companies established in 1959
CA Technologies
Command shells
Text editors